Rabbi Albert E. (Abraham) Gabbai is an American rabbi, serving as the rabbi of the Spanish and Portuguese synagogue Congregation Mikveh Israel since 1988. Mikveh Israel was founded in 1740, and is the second-oldest active congregation in the United States.

Gabbai is a native of Cairo, Egypt. Following the Six-day War in 1967, Gabbai, who was 18 years old at the time, was arrested and sent to prison in Egypt for three years. After being released he went to France and then to the United States.

Early life and education
Gabbai was born in Egypt in 1949 to Jewish immigrant parents. His father was born in Baghdad to a family of rabbis. He came to Egypt as a child with his family, and traded in silk shirts. Gabbai's mother came from a family originally from Leghorn, Italy. They met and married in Egypt.

Gabbai's maternal grandmother was born in Salonica, Greece. Her family spoke Ladino.

There were ten children in the Gabbai family: eight boys and two girls. The family was strictly observant of Judaism.

Like many Jews in Egypt, their culture was French, and Gabbai attended the Collège de la Salle (French Catholic School). The majority of the students were Jews, but there were Christians and Moslems as well.

As a child Gabbai sang in the choir of the Sha'ar Hashamayim Synagogue.

Imprisonment in Egypt

Life in Egypt was generally good for Jews up until the 1940s and 50s. The situation became more strenuous until eventually, the Jews started to leave and immigrate to other countries. Gabbai's four brothers left before 1967 and went to the USA where they became US citizens. Gabbai, three brothers, two sisters, and their widowed mother stayed behind. Their father had died years earlier.

In 1967 Gabbai was 18 years old and in high school. He and the rest of the family were awaiting visas to be permitted to leave Egypt when the Six-Day War broke out.

After the war broke out, and before they could leave, Gabbai and his three brothers were rounded up by the secret service and put in prison camps. First, they took two of his older brothers in June 1967 and a few weeks later they came back for him and another brother. There was no due process, no charges, no trial, and no right to an attorney, they remained in prison till June 1970.

According to Gabbai the cells were made for 30, 40 people but held 70 in each at the time. In the beginning they were in a prison camp in Abu Zaabal for six months and it was very bad, He and his brothers feared that they were going to be killed, and their mother was told they were dead. After six months they were taken to a prison camp in Tora where it became more relaxed. Since his family was strictly observant they only ate vegetables. Eventually, the women and children were allowed to visit, and his mother brought him kosher meat and chicken.

Release and immigration to the United States

In June 1970 under pressure from the outside, they were let go. They were taken from the prison camp directly to the airport, there was no time to stop at home to collect their possessions and were flown to Paris. Their mothers, wives and children followed a few weeks later.

In Paris Gabbai met his family and applied for refugee status to come to the United States. After about a year Gabbai arrived in New York City in 1971.

Gabbai insists that because of his great suffering there he will never go back to Egypt even to visit.

Later education and rabbinical career
 In New York Gabbai attended Yeshiva University.

From 1983 to 1986 Gabbai was the assistant hazzan of Congregation Shearith Israel in New York. Congregation Shearith Israel is a Spanish and Portuguese Synagogue. It is the oldest Jewish congregation in the United States.

Gabbai then traveled to Jerusalem to the Shehebar Sephardic Center under Rabbi Sam Kassin to be ordained a rabbi in the Sephardic tradition. He graduated SSC in 1989.

Gabbai is also a spiritual and musical student of Rabbi Abraham Lopes Cardozo.

Since 1988 Gabbai has been the rabbi of the Spanish-Portuguese Congregation Mikveh Israel in Philadelphia.

Gabbai is fluent in more than six languages. He is a member of the Board of Governors of Gratz College.

Writings and recordings

Writings
A Land of Promise - for the National Museum of American Jewish History
Time is in Our Hands - Passover Devar Torah
Is the menu of the Shabbat meals affected on the preceding Shabbat of Tish'a Be'Ab? - Halachic discussion

Recordings

Speeches
Mikveh Israel of Philadelphia 2013 Shabbaton 
Salute to Our Veterans- at Mikveh Israel Synagogue in Philadelphia,PA 
Remarks to SHIN DC & Embassy of Morocco for Mimouna Mimosa Brunch 2018 
Congregation Mikveh Israel Annual Gala 
Unveiling Portrait of Rabbi Leon H. Elmaleh at Congregation Mikveh Israel

lessons
Video series explaining the Torah reading service on Shabbat Morning according to the Spanish and Portuguese  custom: Part one, Part two,  Part three, Part four

Prayers
Shema Yisrael
Achot Ketanah - Rosh Hashanah
Mizmor le-David - Spanish-Portuguese tradition
En Kelohenu
Yimloch - Yom Kippur
Shabbat Musaf
Ana Bekor’enu - Kal Nidre - Yom Kippur
Addir Vena’or - Kal Nidre - Yom Kippur
Lema’ankha Elohay - Yom Kippur
Yah Shema Ebyonekha - Yom Kippur
El Melekh Yosheb - Yom Kippur
Hatanu Tsurenu - Yom Kippur
Anenu - Adon Heseli’hot - Yom Kippur
Portions for Women’s Service - Rosh Hodesh

opinions
With measles cases still rising, what religion has to say about vaccination
Differing Jewish Views on Valentine’s Day
Rabbis Discuss Jewish View of Capital Punishment
Moral Relativism and Cantors

In the news
Congregation Mikveh Israel Fundraises to Repair Historic Cemetery
Elena Kagan is featured speaker at Touro SYNAGOGUE
 Thanksgiving And Hanukkah To Share The Same Date
Area Jews Prepare For Annual Hanukah Celebration
Jewish Community Responds to Deadly Mosque Attack
The Converso Comeback - Hispanic crypto-Jews use social media and DNA testing to reconnect with their heritage
Extra Room for Historic Transition
Washington's First Letter to Jews Is Lost

See also
Congregation Mikveh Israel
Congregation Shearith Israel
Oldest synagogues in the United States
Jewish exodus from Arab and Muslim countries
1956–57 exodus and expulsions from Egypt

References

External links
Congregation Mikveh Israel official website
“Yede Abraham” a community resource to articulate the Hazzanut in the Western Spanish and Portuguese tradition under the direction of Rabbi Albert Gabbai
Pamphlet for an event by Congregation Shearith Israel celebrating Egyptian Jewish heritage with greeting and article by Rabbi Albert Gabbai 
LEAVING EGYPT - Article in Inyan magazine about the 1956–57 exodus and expulsions from Egypt
Celebrating Egyptian Jewish Heritage at Shearith Israel
"issue_id":"183556","page":58} Article: “select calls – an intimate look at the myriad of ways local rabbis joined the rabbinate” including about Rabbi Gabbai
 Pennsylvania: Out of Egypt - interview with Rabbi Albert Gabbai by American Rabbi Project

American Orthodox rabbis
Yeshiva University alumni
American Sephardic Jews
Sephardi rabbis
Hazzans
Rabbis from Cairo
20th-century American rabbis
Egyptian emigrants to the United States
American people of Egyptian-Jewish descent
Egyptian Sephardi Jews
1949 births
Living people
21st-century American rabbis